Spring Creek is a ghost town in Wilson County, Tennessee, United States.

References

Ghost towns in Tennessee
Geography of Wilson County, Tennessee